Melvon A. Marquette (September 22, 1884 – March 14, 1961 in Springfield, Massachusetts) was an American racing driver. He was also an early aviator.

Biography
Mel Marquette was born near Pyrmont, Indiana on September 22, 1884. He graduated from Purdue University.

An early aviator, he worked with the Wright brothers, and built and flew his own plane in 1910. He became the 13th licensed pilot in the United States.

In the 1930s, he designed and built rubber plants in Belgium and Germany. He worked for Cooper Tire & Rubber Company after World War II.

He died in Findlay, Ohio on March 14, 1961.

Indy 500 results

Reference:

References

1884 births
1961 deaths
Indianapolis 500 drivers
People from Findlay, Ohio
Purdue University alumni
Racing drivers from Massachusetts
Sportspeople from Springfield, Massachusetts